A Helmholtz coil is a device for producing a region of nearly uniform magnetic field, named after the German physicist Hermann von Helmholtz. It consists of two electromagnets on the same axis, carrying an equal electric current in the same direction.  Besides creating magnetic fields, Helmholtz coils are also used in scientific apparatus to cancel external magnetic fields, such as the Earth's magnetic field.

When the pair of two electromagnetics of a Helmholtz coil carry an equal electric current in the opposite direction, it is known as anti-Helmholtz coil, which creates a region of nearly uniform magnetic field gradient, and is used for creating magnetic traps for atomic physics experiments.

Description 
A Helmholtz pair consists of two identical circular magnetic coils that are placed symmetrically along a common axis, one on each side of the experimental area, and separated by a distance  equal to the radius  of the coil. Each coil carries an equal electric current in the same direction.

When a Helmholtz pair of coils carry an equal electric current in the opposite direction, they create a region of nearly uniform magnetic field gradient. This is known as anti-Helmholtz coil, and is used for creating magnetic traps for atomic physics experiments.

In some applications, a Helmholtz coil is used to cancel out the Earth's magnetic field, producing a region with a magnetic field intensity much closer to zero.

Mathematics 

The calculation of the exact magnetic field at any point in space is mathematically complex and involves the study of Bessel functions.
By symmetry, the odd-order terms in the expansion are zero. By arranging the coils so that the origin  is an inflection point for the field strength due to each coil separately, one can guarantee that the order  term is also zero, and hence the leading non-constant term is of order . The inflection point for a simple coil is located along the coil axis at a distance  from its centre.

The calculation detailed below gives the exact value of the magnetic field at the center point. If the radius is R, the number of turns in each coil is n and the current through the coils is I, then the magnetic field B at the midpoint between the coils will be given by

where  is the permeability of free space .

Derivation 

Start with the formula for the on-axis field due to a single wire loop which is itself derived from the Biot–Savart law:

Here

 = the permeability constant = 

 = coil current, in amperes,
 = coil radius, in meters,
 = coil distance, on axis, to point, in meters,
is the distance dependent, dimensionless coefficient.

The Helmholtz coils consists of n turns of wire, so the equivalent current in a one-turn coil is n times the current I in the n-turn coil. Substituting nI for I in the above formula gives the field for an n-turn coil:

Time-varying magnetic field 
Most Helmholtz coils use DC (direct) current to produce a static magnetic field. Many applications and experiments require a time-varying magnetic field. These applications include magnetic field susceptibility tests, scientific experiments, and biomedical studies (the interaction between magnetic field and living tissue). The required magnetic fields are usually either pulse or continuous sinewave. The magnetic field frequency range can be anywhere from near DC (0 Hz) to many kilohertz or even megahertz (MHz). An AC Helmholtz coil driver is needed to generate the required time-varying magnetic field. The waveform amplifier driver must be able to output high AC current to produce the magnetic field.

Driver voltage and current 

Use the above equation in the mathematics section to calculate the coil current for a desired magnetic field, .

where  is the permeability of free space or 

 = coil current, in amperes,

 = coil radius, in meters,

n = number of turns in each coil. 

Then calculate the required Helmholtz coil driver amplifier voltage:

where
  is the peak current, 

High-frequency series resonant 
Generating a static magnetic field is relatively easy; the strength of the field is proportional to the current. Generating a high-frequency magnetic field is more challenging. The coils are inductors, and their impedance increases proportionally with frequency. To provide the same field intensity at twice the frequency requires twice the voltage across the coil. Instead of directly driving the coil with a high voltage, a series resonant circuit may be used to provide the high voltage. A series capacitor is added in series with the coils. The capacitance is chosen to resonate the coil at the desired frequency. Only the coils parasitic resistance remains. This method only works at frequencies close to the resonant frequency; to generate the field at other frequencies requires different capacitors. The Helmholtz coil resonant frequency, and capacitor value, C, are given below.

Maxwell coils

To improve the uniformity of the field in the space inside the coils, additional coils can be added around the outside. James Clerk Maxwell showed in 1873 that a third larger-diameter coil located midway between the two Helmholtz coils with the coil distance increased from coil radius  to  can reduce the variance of the field on the axis to zero up to the sixth derivative of position. This is sometimes called a Maxwell coil.

See also 
 Solenoid
 Halbach array
 A magnetic bottle has the same structure as Helmholtz coils, but with the magnets separated further apart so that the field expands in the middle, trapping charged particles with the diverging field lines. If one coil is reversed, it produces a cusp trap, which also traps charged particles.
Helmholtz coils were designed and built for the Army Research Laboratory's electromagnetic composite testing laboratory in 1993, for testing of composite materials to low-frequency magnetic fields.

References

External links 

 On-Axis Field of an Ideal Helmholtz Coil
 Axial field of a real Helmholtz coil pair
 Helmholtz-Coil Fields by Franz Kraft, The Wolfram Demonstrations Project.
 Kevin Kuns (2007) Calculation of Magnetic Field inside Plasma Chamber, uses elliptic integrals and their derivatives to compute off-axis fields, from PBworks.

 Magnetic Fields of Coils 
 http://physicsx.pr.erau.edu/HelmholtzCoils/

Electromagnetic coils
Magnetic devices
Hermann von Helmholtz